Ristiina (in Swedish also known as Kristina) was a municipality of Finland. It was founded in 1649 and it was named after Kristina Stenbock, the wife of Governor General and Count Per Brahe. From the beginning of the year 2013 is a part of Mikkeli city.

Ristiina is located in the province of Eastern Finland and is part of the Southern Savonia region.
is water.

The municipality is unilingually Finnish.

History 
The area of the later Ristiina municipality was originally a part of the Savilahti parish (the later Mikkelin maalaiskunta), the oldest parish in all of Savonia. By 1541, Savilahti had been divided into the administrative divisions of Pellosniemi and Visulahti. The Pellosniemi division, which included modern Ristiina, had its center in the village of Olkkolanniemi. A farm named Pellosniemi still exists in the village. The Ristiina parish was established in 1649. It was also known as Brahelinna after Per Brahe's manor in the area. Ristiina became the sole official name in 1901. The industrial area of Pellosniemi (not to be confused with old Pellosniemi in Olkkolanniemi) was formed in the 1960s in the southern part of the Rahikkala village. The name is derived from the Pellos factories (Pelloksen tehtaat).

Ristiina was consolidated with the town of Mikkeli in 2013.

References

External links

Municipality of Ristiina – Official website 

Municipalities of South Savo
Brahe family
Populated places established in 1649
1649 establishments in Sweden